Lochluichart railway station is a railway station on the Kyle of Lochalsh Line, serving the village of Lochluichart in the north of Scotland. ScotRail, who manage the station, operate all services.

History 
The station was opened as Lochluichart High by the Dingwall and Skye Railway on 1 August 1871 as a private station for Lady Ashburton on the Lochluichart Estate. It became a public station by 1887.

In 1949 Lochluichart was planned to be relocated to allow the flooding of the area by the Glascarnoch-Luichart-Torr Achilty hydroelectric scheme. On 3 May 1954 a new station was opened as Lochluichart as a result of a hydro electric scheme raising the level of Loch Luichart, constructed of red sandstone.

Facilities 

Facilities are incredibly basic, comprising just a shelter, a help point and a small car park. The station is step-free. As there are no facilities to purchase tickets, passengers must buy one in advance, or from the guard on the train.

Passenger volume 

The statistics cover twelve month periods that start in April.

Services
Four trains each way call (on request) on weekdays/Saturdays and one each way all year on Sundays, plus a second from May to late September only.

References

Bibliography

External links 

Former private railway stations
Railway stations in Highland (council area)
Railway stations served by ScotRail
Railway stations in Great Britain opened in 1871
Former Highland Railway stations
Railway request stops in Great Britain